KSII (93.1 FM, "93.1 KISS-FM") is a radio station that serves the El Paso, Texas, area with hot adult contemporary music. It is under ownership of Townsquare Media.  Its studios are located on North Mesa Street in northwest El Paso and its transmitter is located in the Franklin Mountains.

History
93.1 MHz was the original KAMA-FM, licensed in 1976 to the owners of KAMA at 1060 kHz. In 1982, the FM station separated from KAMA and changed its calls to KAMZ, with the KSII callsign instituted in 1985.

By 2011, KSII reduced the rhythmic contemporary lean, and began acting much like an adult contemporary radio station, but still continues to report as hot adult contemporary per Mediabase & Nielsen BDS.

As of April 16, 2015 the On-Air Talent Lineup is as follows:

 Morning Drive - Mike Martinez & Tricia Martinez (No Relation)
 Mid-Days - Angel Gonzales
 Afternoon Drive - Monika
 Evenings - PopCrush Nights with Lisa Paige
 Weekends - Eddie Gonzalez
 Weekends - Alex Chavez

External links

SII
Radio stations established in 1976
1976 establishments in Texas
Hot adult contemporary radio stations in the United States
Townsquare Media radio stations